Pennsylvania Office of Administration is a cabinet-level agency in Pennsylvania. It is responsible for managing the business support for all other state agencies, boards, and commissions. It also manages the state's emergency broadcast system.

See also
List of Pennsylvania state agencies

References
https://www.oa.pa.gov/Pages/default.aspx

External links
Pennsylvania Office of Administration

State agencies of Pennsylvania